Mardochée Venture (– 12 March 1789) was a French Judaic scholar and translator. He served as secretary and Hebrew interpreter at the Library of King Louis XVI (now the Bibliothèque nationale de France).

In collaboration with Isaïe Vidal (1713–1771), Venture composed the Seder ha-Kontres (Avignon, 1765), a collection of liturgical chants for the use of the Jews of the county of Venaissin. This compilation includes a piyyut composed by Venture, partly in Hebrew and partly in Provençal, which was translated into French by Ernest Sabatier in his Chansons hébraïco-provençales des juifs comtadins (Nîmes, 1874) and by Pedro II of Brazil, in his Poésies hébraïco-provençales du rituel israélite comtadin (Avignon, 1891). Venture's translations of prayer books were republished through the 19th century.

Publications

 
  With Isaïe Vidal.
 
 
 
 
 
 
 
 
 
 
 
  (2d ed., Paris, 1845).

References
 

1789 deaths
18th-century French poets
18th-century French rabbis
French Hebraists
French librarians
French male poets
Clergy from Avignon
Hebrew-language poets
Writers from Avignon
People from Nice
Provençal Jews
Translators from Hebrew
Translators to French
Year of birth uncertain